Racek má zpoždění is a Czech comedy film that was released in 1950.

External links
 

1950 films
1950 comedy films
Czech comedy films
Czechoslovak black-and-white films
1950s Czech films
Czechoslovak comedy films
Czech black-and-white films